Andrew McCluggage (1 September 1900 – 1954) was an Irish professional footballer who played as a full back. As well as playing for several clubs in England and Ireland, he played thirteen games for the Ireland national team, scoring once in a match against Wales on 1 February 1930.

References

1900 births
1954 deaths
People from Larne
Association footballers from Northern Ireland
Pre-1950 IFA international footballers
Association football defenders
Cliftonville F.C. players
Bradford (Park Avenue) A.F.C. players
Burnley F.C. players
Preston North End F.C. players
Dundalk F.C. players
League of Ireland players
Morecambe F.C. players
Larne F.C. players
English Football League players
NIFL Premiership players